Niddrie is a residential suburb in Edinburgh, Scotland. It is situated in the south-east of the city, south-west of the seaside area of Portobello, and west of Musselburgh in East Lothian near Fort Kinnaird retail park.

History
The place name is believed to be of Brythonic origin, *nuada tref meaning "new settlement". It was known historically as Niddry Marischal.

The Wauchope family owned the majority of the area up to the 1930s. Robert Wauchope, Archbishop of Armagh and Primate of Ireland, was born in Niddrie Marischal around  1500. In the 1590s Archibald Wauchope of Niddrie was a supporter of the rebel Earl of Bothwell. The family home Niddrie Marischal House was immediately west of the present-day Jack Kane Centre sports complex in Hunters Hall Park. The Wauchopes eventually donated their lands to the city.

In 1839 John Henderson designed the lodge and gates to the Mansion. The House was demolished although the vaulted tomb-house, which adjoined the western extension, remains as a listed building.

Social housing was built in Niddrie Mains by Edinburgh Corporation from 1927 until the mid-1930s, under the designs of City Architect, Ebenezer James MacRae. The new housing was linked to a major slum clearance scheme in the St. Leonard's Ward of Edinburgh. Families from these cleared areas were housed together with local coal mining families from Niddrie.

The Niddrie Mains estate is now almost completely demolished, with no attempts made to recondition the buildings. The land has been mostly designated for private housing. The land that occupied most of the social housing in the community is being regenerated.
 
The site is currently being developed by PARC, an ALMO or Arms Length Management Organisation, fully owned by the City of Edinburgh Council. The development includes a new primary school for the surrounding area, with the old Niddrie Mill Primary School and St Francis Primary School being put on a joint campus. The first, though unassociated, phase of redevelopment in the Niddrie Mains area was the Hays area, constructed around 2001 and consisting of two-storey blocks with gardens and pedestrianised streets.

Crime

Between the 1980s and 2000s, Niddrie suffered from a high crime rate. Antisocial behaviour is fairly common, though gang fights and knife crime are of a lesser degree today compared to the levels recorded between the 1980s and 2000s. During the 1980s, Niddrie was one of the most drug-riddled communities in Scotland, and still has problems with class A drug use today. For a number of years, the area has had problems with joyriding and youngsters stealing cars and motorbikes. Greendykes and Niddrie Mains was ranked as the fourth-most deprived area in Scotland in the 2006 Scottish Index of Multiple Deprivation

Transport
Niddrie once had its own railway station, on the Edinburgh and Dalkeith Railway.

Lothian Buses provide 6 buses to the area:

2
Gyle Centre - Hermiston Gait - Broomhouse - Saughton - Gorgie - Haymarket - Grassmarket - Southside - Prestonfield - Niddrie - Asda

Sunday buses terminate at Hermiston Gait
Evening Buses terminate at Broomhouse Roundabout

14
Muirhouse - Granton - Pilton - Ferry Road - Leith - Elm Row - North Bridge - Southside - Prestonfield - Niddrie

21
Royal Infirmary - Niddrie - Portobello - Leith - Ferry Road - Silverknowes - Davidsons Mains - Clermiston - Sighthill - Gyle Centre/Clovenstone

30
Musselburgh - Queen Margaret University - Fort Kinnaird - Niddrie - Prestonfield - Southside - Princes Street - Longstone - Wester Hailes

N30
Westside Plaza - Baberton - Clovenstone - Longstone - Princes Street - Niddrie - Queen Margaret University - Stoneybank - Musselburgh

Community Arts
Immediately adjacent to Craigmillar, and part of Edinburgh City's political ward Craigmillar/Portobello, it was also the home of the Craigmillar Festival Society, a community arts organisation, founded by local mother and "Woman Of Achievement" Helen Crummy.

References

External links
Niddrie at Gazetteer for Scotland
Photos of Niddrie

Areas of Edinburgh